Pranas Čepėnas (4 April 1899 in Veleikiai, Kovno Governorate – 3 December 1980 in Worcester, Massachusetts) was a Lithuanian historian, encyclopedist, journalist, and lexicographer. In 1926 Čepėnas earned a diploma in history from University of Lithuania. He worked as professor of history at Vilnius University. During World War II he emigrated to Germany and later to the U.S.

Major works
Editor of interwar Lietuviškoji enciklopedija (Lithuanian Encyclopedia) and Dictionary of International Words.
Naujųjų laikų Lietuvos istorija vol I and II (1988),  
Editor of Lietuviškoji enciklopedija printed in Boston.

External links
 Article about his book in Lituanus magazine 

1899 births
1980 deaths
People from Zarasai District Municipality
People from Novoalexandrovsky Uyezd
20th-century Lithuanian historians
Historians of Lithuania
Lithuanian encyclopedists
Lithuanian lexicographers
Lithuanian male writers
Vytautas Magnus University alumni
Academic staff of Vilnius University
20th-century lexicographers